Jacques De Fence is the eighth studio album by King Creosote, released in 1999.

Track listing
You won't regret it 
Pulliing up creels 
Thanks but no thanks 
Counselling 
The nobody now 
Little paint 
Little space 
Leslie 
Powerful stuff 
Caesar 
Mark van asaalt 
Locked Together

1999 albums
King Creosote albums